Foreign relations exist between Austria and Japan.  Both countries established diplomatic relations in 1869, that lasted until severed in 1914 due to the First World War. Relations were reestablished following the war.  Austria has an embassy in Tokyo and four honorary consulates: in Hiroshima, Nagoya, Osaka and Sapporo.  Japan has an embassy in Vienna and an honorary consulate in Salzburg.

History 
In 1869, the first Austro-Hungarian diplomatic mission arrived at Japan, headed by Baron Anton Freiherr von Petz. Following negotiations, the first Austro-Japanese treaty of friendship was concluded on October 18 of the same year.

In June 1999, the President of Austria Thomas Klestil paid a state visit to Japan. It was the first state visit of an Austrian President to Japan.

In 2007, Japan was Austria's third most important overseas trade partner.

See also
Foreign relations of Austria
Foreign relations of Japan
Japan–EU relations

Notes and references

External links
 Austrian Foreign Ministry: list of bilateral treaties with Japan (in German only)
Austrian embassy in Tokyo
Japanese Foreign Affairs Ministry about the relation with Austria 
Japanese embassy in Vienna

 
Japan
Bilateral relations of Japan